Dávid Vecsernyés (born 22 March 1991 in Budapest) is a Hungarian artistic gymnast.

Career 
Dávid Vecsernyés won a bronze in the senior team event at the 2020 European Men's Artistic Gymnastics Championships, horizontal bar event at the 2018 European Men's Artistic Gymnastics Championships, and the horizontal bar event at the 2019 European Games.

References

Living people
1991 births
Hungarian male artistic gymnasts
Gymnasts from Budapest
21st-century Hungarian people